Rail transport in the United Arab Emirates is an expanding mode of transport.

Etihad Rail is the national railway company, and is a state-owned company.

Mainline
The United Arab Emirates' mainline railway network is owned and operated by Etihad Rail.

Etihad Rail will be linked to the networks of neighbouring Arab states of the Persian Gulf countries via the Gulf Railway.

Urban

 Dubai Metro
 Palm Jumeirah Monorail in Dubai
 Dubai Tram
 Dubai Trolley
 Dubai International Airport Automated People Mover

Under construction or proposed 
 Abu Dhabi Metro
 Abu Dhabi tram
 Sharjah Metro
 Sharjah Tram 
 Ajman Tram

See also
Etihad Rail
Transport in the United Arab Emirates

References

Rail transport in the United Arab Emirates
United Arab Emirates